The Strangers' Burying Ground, also known as Potter's Field, was the first non-denominational cemetery in York, Upper Canada (now Toronto, Ontario). It was established in 1826 as the York General Burying Ground, and it was later known as the Toronto General Burying Ground after the town of York became the city of Toronto in 1834.

The cemetery was located on the northwest corner of what is now the intersection of Yonge Street and Bloor Street. It operated from 1826 to 1855, with an initial £75 land purchase and 300 subscriptions for £1.

History
The cemetery was founded in 1826 by the Trustees of the General Burying Ground for residents who were not Anglican or Catholic – and thus effectively banned from burial in the town's established cemeteries as undesirables. The cemetery was located beyond the legal boundaries of the then-town of York, and within large wooded lots north of Bloor Street.

When the 6-acre cemetery closed in 1855 after 6,685 interments, the families of the deceased were invited to arrange for moving the graves to another cemetery. During the subsequent twenty years, many of the graves were gradually relocated to Toronto Necropolis in the Cabbagetown neighbourhood. The remainder (approximately 3,000) were moved between 1876 and 1881 to Mount Pleasant Cemetery, which opened in November 1876 near the Deer Park neighbourhood.

As Toronto grew, the lands that were once part of the cemetery were acquired and developed for residential use. The area later transformed into the upscale mixed-use (but now mainly commercial) neighbourhood of Yorkville.

Notable interments
 Samuel Lount, who was executed for participating in the Upper Canada Rebellion of 1837
 Peter Matthews, who was executed for participating in the Upper Canada Rebellion of 1837
 James Worts, co-founder of Gooderham and Worts, along with his wife and daughter (all died in 1834)

See also
 List of cemeteries in Toronto
 Victoria Memorial Square

References

Cemeteries in Toronto
1826 establishments